Josephus Thomas (born 11 July 1971) is a Sierra Leonean sprinter. He competed in the men's 4 × 100 metres relay at the 1996 Summer Olympics.

References

External links
 

1971 births
Living people
Athletes (track and field) at the 1996 Summer Olympics
Sierra Leonean male sprinters
Olympic athletes of Sierra Leone
Athletes (track and field) at the 1998 Commonwealth Games
Commonwealth Games competitors for Sierra Leone
Sierra Leone Creole people
Place of birth missing (living people)
Universiade medalists in athletics (track and field)
Universiade medalists for Sierra Leone
Medalists at the 1991 Summer Universiade